The Liberal Centre was a political party in Denmark between 1965 and 1969.

History
The party was established on 10 September 1965. Amongst its founders were Niels Westerby and Børge Diderichsen, who had left Venstre over taxation policy.

The party received 2.5% of the national vote in the 1966 elections, winning four seats. However, the party lost all four seats in the 1968 elections. It was dissolved the following year.

References

Defunct political parties in Denmark
Political parties established in 1965
Political parties disestablished in 1969
1965 establishments in Denmark
1969 disestablishments in Denmark
Liberal parties in Denmark

da:Liberalt Centrum